The Protector is a Turkish drama fantasy series starring Çağatay Ulusoy. The show was created by Binnur Karaevli, and the first season was directed by Umut Aral, Gönenç Uyanık, and Can Evrenol. The story is adapted from Turkish novelist Nilüfer İpek Gökdel's mystery novel Karakalem ve Bir Delikanlının Tuhaf Hikayesi (A Strange Story of Charcoal and a Young Man), which was published in 2016. The first season consists of ten episodes and became available for streaming on Netflix on 14 December 2018. The second season consists of eight episodes and became available on 26 April 2019. On 10 June 2019, the series was renewed for seasons 3 and 4. The fourth and last season was released on 9 July 2020.

Synopsis
After his adoptive father, Neşet, is killed, Hakan Demir, an Istanbul shopkeeper, discovers that he is connected to an ancient secret order whose duty is to protect the city. Hakan must embrace his family's legacy as the Protector, a hero with the duty to kill the Immortal and prevent the city's destruction.

He is helped by Kemal and his daughter, Zeynep, members of the secret order of the Loyal Ones, who are dedicated to assisting the Protector.

Cast and characters

Main
 Çağatay Ulusoy as
 the Last Protector, Hakan Demir, a man in his twenties who works for his adoptive father, Neşet, in their small antique shop in the Grand Bazaar but dreams of opening a bigger store and becoming successful. After Neşet is killed by people looking for a mysterious Ottoman shirt, Zeynep and Kemal tell him to put the shirt on. As it fuses with his body, he becomes the Protector, the series' protagonist. (seasons 1–4)
 the First Protector, Harun Muhafız
 Hazar Ergüçlü as Zeynep Erman, one of the Loyal Ones and Hakan's prevailing love interest. She is not much impressed with Hakan at first as she trains him in combat techniques but eventually becomes devoted to him and risks her life for him repeatedly. (seasons 1–4)
 Okan Yalabık as Faysal Erdem / Hüsrev Hodja, the series' antagonist, second Immortal, and a successful businessman whose career has inspired Hakan to try to better himself. (seasons 1–4)
 Ayça Ayşin Turan as Leyla Sancak, Erdem's assistant  and Hakan's first love interest (seasons 1–2)
 Burçin Terzioğlu as Rüya Erdem / Sultan Cavidan, Faysal's wife / love interest (guest: seasons 1 and 4; main: seasons 2–3)
 Funda Eryiğit as Nisan Türk / Valeria, a chemist, first Immortal, and grand vizier; Hakan and Harun's love interest. (seasons 3–4)
 Engin Öztürk as Levent Demir, Hakan's brother (seasons 2–3)
 Yurdaer Okur as Kemal Erman, Zeynep's pharmacist father, also a Loyal One (season 1)

Supporting
 Mehmet Kurtuluş as Mazhar Dragusha, Erdem's henchman (season 1)
 Mehmet Yilmaz Ak as Tekin, a corrupt cop on Erdem's payroll (seasons 1, 4)
 Yücel Erten as Neşet Korkmaz, Hakan's adoptive father and a Loyal One (season 1)
 Cankat Aydos as Memo, Hakan's cousin with a gambling problem (season 1)
 Defne Kayalar as Suzan Bayraktar (season 1)
 Cihat Süvarioğlu as Yasin Karakaya, a journalist (season 1)
 Cem Yiğit Üzümoğlu as Emir, a Loyal One (season 1)
 Şenay Aydın as Derya, a Fallen One (seasons 1–2)
 Kubilay Karslıoğlu as Serdar, a Loyal One (seasons 1–2)
 Helin Kandemir as Ceylan, a Loyal One (seasons 1–2)
 Hakan Ummak as Can, a Loyal One (season 2)
 Çiğdem Selışık Onat as Azra, a Loyal One (season 2)
 Saygın Soysal as Mergen, an Immortal (seasons 2–4)
 Boran Kuzum as Okhan, an Immortal (seasons 2–4)
 Ayse Melike Çerçi as Piraye, an Immortal (seasons 2–4)
 Miray Daner as the Oracle (seasons 2–4)
 Emre Mutlu as Sami, a Loyal One (seasons 3–4)
 İlayda Alişan as Aylin, a Loyal One, later an Immortal (seasons 3–4)
 Bige Önal as Berrin, a Loyal One (seasons 3–4)
 Halit Özgür Sarı as Arif, a Loyal One (seasons 3–4)
 Taner Ölmez as Burak, a young man who helps Hakan and the Loyal Ones; Zeynep's love interest (seasons 3–4)
 Aksel Bonfil as Azim, Harun's best friend (season 4)
 Idil Yade Kirnik as Şirin, Harun's daughter (season 4)

Episodes

Season 1 (2018)

Season 2 (2019)

Season 3 (2020)

Season 4 (2020)

Production
Principal photography began on 7 March 2018, in Istanbul.

References

External links
 
 

Turkish-language Netflix original programming
2018 Turkish television series debuts
2020 Turkish television series endings
Turkish drama television series
Television shows set in Istanbul
Television shows based on novels
Turkic mythology in popular culture
Fantasy television series